Ewo or EWO may refer to:
 Ewo, a village in the Republic of the Congo
 Ewo Airport
 Ewo District
 Ewo (hong), a Qing dynasty hong
 Electronic warfare officer
 Emergency War Order
 EWO Brewery
 Ewondo language
 Jon Ewo (born 1957), Norwegian novelist